Chromidina elegans is a species of parasitic ciliates. It is a parasite of the cuttlefish Sepia elegans, which was described from off Naples, Italy, by Foettinger in 1881 under the name Benedenia elegans  and latter assigned to the genus Chromidina by Gonder, in 1905. The species was redescribed by Chatton & Lwoff in 1935.

Chromidina elegans was redescribed in 2016 from material in the collections of the Muséum National d'Histoire Naturelle in Paris, and a neohapantotype and paraneohapantotypes were assigned to the taxon.

References 

Oligohymenophorea
Species described in 1881
Parasites of molluscs
Parasitic alveolates